Kenneth Walker (born January 11, 1953) is an American project manager and Democratic politician. He is a current member of the Mississippi House of Representatives, having represented the 27th district since 2016.

Biography 
Kenneth Walker was born on January 11, 1953, in Carthage, Mississippi. He received B. S. and M. S. degrees from Jackson State University. In 2015, he was elected to represent the 27th district in the Mississippi House of Representatives. He was re-elected in 2019.

References 

1953 births
Living people
Democratic Party members of the Mississippi House of Representatives
People from Carthage, Mississippi